Creagh's horseshoe bat (Rhinolophus creaghi) is a species of bat in the family Rhinolophidae. It is found in Indonesia and Malaysia.

References

Rhinolophidae
Mammals described in 1896
Taxonomy articles created by Polbot
Taxa named by Oldfield Thomas
Bats of Southeast Asia